Nolan B. Aughenbaugh (born 1928) is an American Professor Emeritus of Geological Engineering at the University of Mississippi.

Biography
Aughenbaugh was born in Akron, Ohio and was an Antarctic explorer during the International Geophysical Year.  He also holds a Ph.D. in Civil Engineering from Purdue University.

Aughenbaugh is married and has three children.

Academic career

Awards and honors
Aughenbaugh Peak was named for Nolan B. Aughenbaugh by the Advisory Committee on Antarctic Names (US-ACAN)
The Aughenbaugh Gabbro, part of the Dufek Intrusion, Antarctica was named for Nolan B. Aughenbaugh

Published works
 Preliminary report on the geology of the Dufek Massif: IG Y World Data Center A glaciology, Gla. Rept, 1961
 Characterization Of Swelling Potential Of Shale Strata

External links
 The National Academies: The International Geophysical Year – Official Website
 Aughenbaugh Gabbro from the Dr. Arthur B. Ford Collection – US Geological Survey
 Byrd Polar Research Center Archival Program: Polar Oral History Program transcript of 29-Jul-2005 interview

References

Living people
Explorers of Antarctica
Engineering educators
Purdue University College of Engineering alumni
University of Mississippi faculty
American civil engineers
1928 births
Missouri University of Science and Technology faculty